Massimo Mirabelli (born 21 October 1991) is a Canadian soccer player who last played professionally for arena soccer team Mississauga MetroStars of the Major Arena Soccer League.

Club career
Mirabelli began his career with Portugal FC of the Canadian Soccer League in 2010. He recorded his first goal for the organization on June 25, 2010, in a 3–2 victory over Milltown F.C. He scored his first professional hat-trick in a match against Brantford Galaxy. He assisted in Portugal's qualification for the postseason by finishing fifth on the overall standings. He contributed with a goal in the semi-final match against Brantford Galaxy, but Portugal was eliminated from the playoffs after losing that match to a score of 5–3. Mirabelli returned to Toronto for the 2011 season and clinched his first regular season title with the club. In the quarterfinals of the playoffs he scored two goals in a 4–3 victory over York Region Shooters, but their match went into penalties as their two-game series was tied by a score of 4–4 on goals on aggregate, and subsequently Toronto would lose in the penalty shootout.

In 2012, he signed with Ekenäs IF of the Kakkonen in Finland. Mirabelli signed with FC Edmonton of the North American Soccer League on 4 March 2013 after impressing the club while on trials. On 6 April 2013 he made his debut for the club against the Fort Lauderdale Strikers in which he came on in the 87th minute for Shaun Saiko as Edmonton drew the match 1–1.

Mirabelli joined Toronto FC II on March 20, 2015. He made his debut against the Charleston Battery on March 21. Mirabelli was let go at the end of the 2015 season as his contract was not renewed .

In 2016, Mirabelli signed with League1 Ontario side Vaughan Azzurri, making five league appearances and scoring two goals that season. In 2018, he made added another five appearances and two goals in league play, and made another two appearances in the playoffs, scoring one goal. In the winter of 2018–19, he played indoor soccer in the Mississauga-based Arena Premier League with the Caribbean Stars AC.

International career
In 2011 Mirabelli played with the Canada U20s during the 2011 CONCACAF U-20 Championship in Guatemala.

Career statistics

Club
Statistics accurate as of November 2, 2014

References

External links
 
 FC Edmonton Profile.

1991 births
Living people
Association football midfielders
Canadian soccer players
Canadian people of Italian descent
Canadian expatriate soccer players
Expatriate footballers in Finland
Canadian expatriate sportspeople in Finland
Soccer players from Brampton
SC Toronto players
Ekenäs IF players
FC Edmonton players
Toronto FC II players
Mississauga MetroStars players
Canadian Soccer League (1998–present) players
Kakkonen players
North American Soccer League players
USL Championship players
League1 Ontario players
Major Arena Soccer League players
Canada men's youth international soccer players
Vaughan Azzurri players